Sleeping Betty is a Canadian animated short film by Claude Cloutier that humorously reinterprets the classic fairy tale Sleeping Beauty. Awards for the film include Best Animated Short at the 29th Genie Awards, the Audience Award at the Etiuda&Anima International Film Festival, the Audience Award and Judges Award at the Melbourne International Animation Festival, Best Animation at the Jutra Award, as well as the Public Prize and the Best Canadian Animation Award at the  Ottawa International Animation Festival.

References

2007 short films
Canadian animated short films
National Film Board of Canada animated short films
Films based on Sleeping Beauty
Best Animated Short Film Genie and Canadian Screen Award winners
2000s animated short films
2007 animated films
2007 films
Canadian children's animated films
Films directed by Claude Cloutier
Animated films without speech
2000s Canadian films
Best Animated Short Film Jutra and Iris Award winners